Michael Billen (4 October 1955 – 4 January 2022) was a German politician. A member of the Christian Democratic Union of Germany, he served in the Landtag of Rhineland-Palatinate from 1996 to 2020. Billen died of leukemia on 4 January 2022, at the age of 66.

References

1955 births
2022 deaths
20th-century German politicians
21st-century German politicians
Christian Democratic Union of Germany politicians
Members of the Landtag of Rhineland-Palatinate
People from Trier
Deaths from cancer in Germany
Deaths from leukemia